The 1920 European Rowing Championships were rowing championships held on 15 August on the Saône in the French city Mâcon. The competition was for men only and they competed in five boat classes (M1x, M2x, M2+, M4+, M8+), the same ones as used at the 1920 Summer Olympics in Antwerp later in the same month. These were the first European Rowing Championships held after WWI; the previous championships had been held in 1913 in Ghent.

Medal summary

References

European Rowing Championships
European Rowing Championships
Rowing
Rowing
European Rowing Championships
European